Seymour Chatman (August 30, 1928 – November 4, 2015) was an American film and literary critic and professor emeritus of rhetoric at the University of California, Berkeley.

He is one of the most significant figures of American narratology (theory of narrative), regarded as a prominent representative of its Structuralist or "classic" branch.

Personal life 
Seymour Chatman was married three times, to Evelyn (divorced in 1964), Sidsel (divorced circa 1970), and Barbara. He has three children, Emily Chatman Duffy, an artist, Jennifer Chatman, a professor, and Mariel Chatman Lassalle, a lawyer.  He has four granddaughters, Ava, Sonya, Noemie, and Anais.

Published works
Chatman's work includes:
 The Later Style of Henry James (1972)
 Story and Discourse: Narrative Structure in fiction and Film (1978)
 Michelangelo Antonioni, or, the Surface of the World (1985)
 Coming to Terms. The Rhetoric of Narrative in Fiction and Film (1990)
 Reading Narrative Fiction (1993)
 Michelangelo Antonioni: The Complete Films (2004) with Paul Duncan

References

External links
 

1928 births
American film critics
American literary critics
University of California, Berkeley College of Letters and Science faculty
2015 deaths